The 2016 Louisiana–Lafayette Ragin' Cajuns football team represented the University of Louisiana at Lafayette in the 2016 NCAA Division I FBS football season. They were led by sixth-year head coach Mark Hudspeth and played their home games at Cajun Field in Lafayette, Louisiana. The Ragin' Cajuns were members of the Sun Belt Conference. They finished the season 6–7, 5–3 in Sun Belt play to finish in fifth place. They were invited to the New Orleans Bowl where they lost to Southern Miss.

Preseason

Award watchlists

Sun Belt Media Day

Predicted standings

Preseason All–Conference Team

Offense
QB Brandon Silvers (Troy)
RB Jalin Moore (Appalachian State)
RB Jordan Chunn (Troy)
WR Robert Davis (Georgia State)
WR Al Riles (Louisiana-Lafayette)
WR Emanuel Thompson (Troy)
TE Gerald Everett (South Alabama)
OL Parker Collins (Appalachian State)
OL Colby Gossett (Appalachian State)
OL Jermar Clark (Arkansas State)
OL Andy Kwon (Georgia Southern)
OL Antonio Garcia (Troy)

Defense
DL Chris Odom (Arkansas State)
DL Javon Rolland-Jones (Arkansas State)
DL Randy Allen (South Alabama)
DL Rashad Dillard (Troy)
LB Deshawntee "Ironhead" Gallon (Georgia Southern)
LB Otha Peters (Louisiana-Lafayette)
LB Rodney Butler (New Mexico State)
DB Clifton Duck (Appalachian State)
DB Mondo Williams (Appalachian State)
DB Money Hunter (Arkansas State)
DB Bobby Baker (Georgia State)
DB Jeremy Reaves (South Alabama)

Specialists
PK Younghoe Koo (Georgia Southern)
P Austin Rehkow (Idaho)
RS Jabir Frye (Troy)
AP Jordan Chunn (Troy)

Honorable Mentions
WR Keenan Barnes
DL Karmichael Dunbar
OL Eddie Gordon
LB Tre'maine Lightfoot

Roster

Schedule

Schedule source:

Game summaries

Boise State

McNeese State

South Alabama

at Tulane

at New Mexico State

Appalachian State

at Texas State

Idaho

at Georgia Southern

at Georgia

Arkansas State

at Louisiana–Monroe

Southern Miss (New Orleans Bowl)

References

Louisiana-Lafayette
Louisiana Ragin' Cajuns football seasons
Louisiana-Lafayette Ragin' Cajuns football